José Manuel Briceño Guerrero (Palmarito, Apure, Venezuela, 6 March 1929 - Mérida, 31 October 2014) was a Venezuelan writer, philologist and philosopher. A large part of his work was published under the pen-name Jonuel Brigue.

After doctoring in Vienna in 1961 with a thesis entitled “The Socio-Psychological Foundations of Latin American Spanish,” Briceño Guerrero worked for decades as Professor of Philosophy and Classical languages at the Universidad de Los Andes, Mérida. In 1981 he was awarded the Venezuelan Premio Nacional de Ensayo, and in 1996 the Premio Nacional de Cultura (Literatura). He is considered one of the most influential and original Latin-American thinkers, and some of his works have been translated into French and German, some as part of the UNESCO Collection of Representative Works.

Works 

 1962: ¿Qué es la Filosofía?, Mérida, Universidad de Los Andes. Free PDF
 1965: Dóulos Oukóon, Caracas, Arte. Free PDF
 1966: América Latina en el Mundo, Caracas, Arte. Free PDF
 1967: Triandáfila, Caracas, Arte. Free PDF
 1970: El Origen del Lenguaje, Caracas, Monte Ávila. Free PDF
 1977: La identificación Americana con la Europa Segunda, Mérida, Universidad de Los Andes. See preface
 Discurso Salvaje, Caracas, Fundarte.
 1981: América y Europa en el Pensar Mantuano, Caracas, Monte Ávila Editores.
 Geraldine Saldate, Mérida, Universidad de Los Andes: Talleres Gráficos Universitarios.
 1983: Recuerdo y Respeto para el Héroe Nacional (Speech delivered in representation of all Venezuelan universities upon the 200th anniversary celebrations of the birth of Simón Bolívar), Mérida, Universidad de Los Andes: Revista Azul. Free PDF 
 1984: Holadios, Caracas, Fundarte.
 1987: Amor y Terror de las Palabras, Caracas, Mandorla. Free PDF
 1990: El Pequeño Arquitecto del Universo, Caracas, Alfadil. Free PDF
 1992: Anfisbena. Culebra Ciega, Caracas, Editorial Greca. Free PDF
 1993: L’Enfance d’un Magicien (French translation of Amor y Terror de las Palabras by Nelly Lhermillier), Paris, Editions de L’Aube.
 1994: Le Discours Sauvage (French translation of Discurso Salvaje by Nelly Lhermillier), Paris, Editions de L’Aube.
 El Laberinto de los Tres Minotauros, Caracas, Monte Ávila.
 1996: “Les droits humains et les practiques de domination”, in: Qui sommes-nous, Paris, UNESCO.
 1997: Diario de Saorge, Caracas, Fundación Polar.
 Discours des Lumières suivi de Discours des Seigneurs (French translation by Nelly Lhermillier), Paris, Editions de L’Aube – UNESCO.
 1998: Esa Llanura Temblorosa, Caracas, Oscar Todtmann Editores. View partial PDF
 2000: Matices de Matisse, Mérida, Universidad de Los Andes: Consejo de Publicaciones. View partial PDF
 2001: Trece Trozos y Tres Trizas, Mérida, Ediciones Puerta del Sol. Free PDF
 2002: El tesaracto y la tetractis, Caracas, Oscar Todtmann Editores.
 2004: Mi casa de los dioses. Mérida, Ediciones del Vicerrectorado Académico, Universidad de Los Andes.
 2004: Los recuerdos, los sueños y la razón. Mérida, Ediciones Puerta del Sol. Free PDF
 2007: Para ti me cuento a China. Mérida, Venezuela: Ediciones Puerta del Sol, 2007.
 2009: La Mirada Terrible. Mérida, Venezuela: Ediciones Puerta del Sol.
 2010: Los chamanes de China. Mérida, Venezuela: Ediciones Puertas del Sol-Universidad Experimental de Yaracuy.
 2011: Operación Noé. Mérida, Venezuela: Ediciones Puertas del Sol-Universidad Experimental de Yaracuy.
 2011: El garrote y la máscara, Venezuela: Ediciones La Castalia.
 2012: 3x1=4 (Retratos), Venezuela: Ediciones La Castalia.
 2013: Dios es mi laberinto. Venezuela, Ediciones La Castalia.
 2014: Cantos de mi Majano, Caracas: Fundación Editorial El perro y la rana.

Other articles and minor works are referenced in the Spanish Wikipedia article.

Notes

External links
 An obituary in English, with links.
 Universidad de Los Andes author page, with access to digital versions of several works
 The Savage Discourse. English translation of the basics of Briceño's thought on Latin America.

1929 births
2014 deaths
20th-century novelists
20th-century philosophers
Academic staff of the Central University of Venezuela
Classical philologists
Latin Americanists
Philosophers of language
Academic staff of the University of the Andes (Venezuela)
University of Vienna alumni
Venezuelan essayists
Venezuelan novelists
Venezuelan male writers
Venezuelan philosophers
Venezuelan writers
20th-century male writers